The Doxy is a brand of British-made wand vibrators. The Doxy was created in 2013 in response to the unavailability of the Hitachi Magic Wand in the United Kingdom. It has been described as the most powerful wand vibrator on the market.

, it is manufactured by CMG Leisure in Callington, in the county of Cornwall in the south of England.

References

External links 
 

Vibrators
British brands
2013 establishments in the United Kingdom
Callington
Companies based in Cornwall